Butter salt is a seasoning developed in the late twentieth century for the purpose of combining the flavours found in salt and butter. It is a fine, golden powder, originally salt, enriched with butter flavouring. It is often used as a seasoning for popcorn. It is said to impart a "rich, buttery flavour".

The contents are usually salt, artificial butter flavoring, and yellow food colouring.

See also

 Molly McButter
 Popcorn seasoning

References 

Edible salt
Popcorn
Foods featuring butter